Superbird-B1, sometimes identified as Superbird-1B, was a geostationary communications satellite designed and manufactured by Ford Aerospace on the SSL 1300 
satellite bus. It was originally ordered by Space Communications Corporation (SCC), which later merged into the SKY Perfect JSAT Group. It had a mixed Ku-band, Ka-band and X-band payload and was rushed into launch at the 162° East longitude due to the launch failure of Superbird-B.

It was ordered in 1985 along Superbird-A, Superbird-B and Superbird-A1 on the very first order of the SSL 1300 platform. It was also the second satellite of SCC on orbit and the fourth commercial satellite of Japan to enter operations. It was used for video distribution, news gathering, remote publishing and high definition TV service to the main islands of Japan and Okinawa.

Satellite description
The spacecraft was the third satellite designed and manufactured by Ford Aerospace on the SSL 1300 satellite bus. It was based on the design of the Intelsat V series and offered a three-axis stabilized platform.

With its solar panels fully extended it spanned . Its power system generated approximately 4 kW of power due to two wings with three solar panels each. It also had two NiH2 batteries to survive the solar eclipses. It would serve as the main satellite on the 162°E longitude position of the Superbird fleet.

It included enough propellant for orbit circularization and 10 years of operation.

Its payload is composed of 23 Ku-band plus 3 Ka-band and 2 X-band transponders.

History 
Space Communications Corporation (SCC) was founded in 1985, the same year as the original companies that later formed JSAT. In 1986, SCC ordered four spacecraft, Superbird-1, Superbird-2, Superbird-A1 and Superbird-B1, from Ford Aerospace, which became Space Systems/Loral in October 1990.

On 22 February 1990 at 23:17:00 UTC, Superbird-2 launch failed and the satellite was lost. Thus, Superbird-B1 was rushed and delivered in just 19 months. On 26 February 1992 at 23:58:10 UTC Superbird-B1, the fourth private communications satellite of Japan to orbit, was launched aboard an Ariane 44L along Arabsat-1C. It was injected into a 222 km × 35,776 km × 7° geosynchronous transfer orbit (GTO), from which it climbed through three liquid apogee engine (LAE) firings.

References 

Communications satellites in geostationary orbit
Satellites using the SSL 1300 bus
Spacecraft launched in 1992
Communications satellites of Japan
1992 in Japan